Luftflotte 4 (Air Fleet 4) was one of the primary divisions of the German Luftwaffe in World War II.  It was formed on March 18, 1939, from Luftwaffenkommando Österreich in Vienna. The Luftflotte was redesignated on 21 April 1945, to Luftwaffenkommando 4, and became subordinated to Luftflotte 6. It was the Luftflotte 4, that was responsible for the bombing campaign of Stalingrad, where ca. 40,000 civilians died. This Luftwaffe detachment was based in Romania, Bulgaria, Southeast Poland, Hungary, Ukraine and Russian occupied territories, for supporting Axis forces; with command offices in Morczyn, Hungary, during 26 June 1944, Eastern Front.

See Organization of the Luftwaffe (1933–1945) for explanation of abbreviations used below.

Strategic reconnaissance
2.(F)/11 (Jasionka)
2.(F)/22 (Focşani)
2.(F)/100 (Lublin)

Transports (special duties)
14 St./Transportgeschwader 4 (Odessa)

I. Fliegerkorps (I. Air Corps) Focşani

Strategic reconnaissance
3.(F)/121 (Ziliştea)
NSt.1 (Focşani)

Tactical reconnaissance
Stab/NAGr.1(Chişinău)
2/NAGr.16 (Chişinău)
Stab/NAGr.14(Comrat)
1./NAGr.14 (Comrat)
2./NAGr.14 (Bacău)

Maritime reconnaissance
Stab/FAGr.125(See) (Constanţa)
1.(F)/125 (See) (Varna, Bulgaria)
3.(F)/125 (See) (Mamaia)
(Rum)A.St.22/1 (Ciocârlia, Romania)
(Rum)101.A.St. (Mamaia)
(Bulg)See. A.St.(Varna, Bulgaria)

Fighters
Stab/JG 52 (Manzar)
I./JG 52 (Leipzig, Romania)
II./JG 52 (Manzar)
III./JG 52 (Roman)
15(Kroat.)/JG 52 (Ziliştea)

Land air strike
Stab/SG 2 (Huşi)
I./SG 2  (Huşi)
II./SG 2 (Ziliştea)
III./SG 2 (Huşi)
II./SG 10 (Culm)
10.(Pz)/SG 2 (Trotuş)
14.(Pz)/SG 2 (Trotuş)

Night land attack
Stab/NSGr.5 (Manzar)
1./NSGr.5 (Roman)
2./NSGr.5 (Chişinău)
3./NSGr.5 (Chişinău)

Bombers (medium)
I./KG.4 (Focşani)

VIII.Fliegerkorps (VIII Air Corps) Lubien Poland

Strategic reconnaissance
2.(F)/11 (Jasionka)
2.(F)/100 (Lubin)

Tactical reconnaissance
Stab/NAGr.2(Strunybaby)
1./NAGr.2(Strunybaby)
2./NAGr.2(Strunybaby)

Land air strike
Stab IV(Pz)/SG.9 (Lisiatycze)
12.(Pz)/SG.9 (Strunybaby)
13.(Pz)/SG.9(Lisiatycze)
Stab./SG.77 (Jasionka)
I./SG.77 (Jasionka)
II./SG.77(Lemberg)
III./SG.77(Cuniov)
10.(Pz)/SG.77(Starzava)
(Ung)S.St. G.102/1(Cuniov)
(Ung)(101 C.O.)St. G.101(Borgond-Balaton)

Night land attack
Stab/NSGr.4 (Hordinia)
1./NSGr.4 (Hordinia)

Bombers
14.(Eis.)KG.27 (Krosno)

Fliegerführer 102 Ungarn (102 Air Direction in Hungary) Łabunie

Tactical reconnaissance
(Ung)N.A.St.102/1 (Łabunie)
7./NAGr.32 (Łabunie)

Fighters
(Ung)J.St.102/1 (Zamość)

Bombers
(Ung)K.St.102/1 (Klemensova)

Rapid bombers
(Ung)SK.St.102/1 (Klemensova)

Romanien I Fliegerkorps (I Romanian Air Corps) Tecuci

Strategic/tactical reconnaissance
(Rum)2.(F) A.St. (Iveşti)
(Rum)102 A.St. (Vilkov)
(Rum)(C.A.1)1A.St.(Bacău)

Fighters
(Rum)II./JG.3 (Bacău)
(Rum)65./J.St. (Bacău)
(Rum)66./J.St. (Bacău)
(Rum)67./J.St. (Bacău)
Stab(Rum) IV.JGr.45 (Ianca)
(Rum).45 J.St. (Ianca)
(Rum).46 J.St. (Ianca)
(Rum).49 J.St. (Ianca)
(Rum).IX JGr. (Tecuci)
(Rum).47 J.St.(Tecuci)
(Rum).48 J.St.(Tecuci)
(Rum).56 J.St.(Tecuci)

Tactical support (dive bombers)
(Rum)StG.3 (Călimănești?) StG is Sturzkampfgeschwader, dive bombers
(Rum)StG.4 (Huşi)
(Rum)StG.8 (Matca)
(Rum)(G.P.)StG.3(Detach) (Odessa)
(Rum)(G.P.)StG.3 (Cioara-Dolcești)

Bombers
(Rum)KG.2 (Țăndărei)
(Rum)KG.4 (Țăndărei)
(Rum)76 K.St.(Ianca)
(Rum)78 K.St.(Ianca)
(Rum)V KGr. (Iveşti)
(Rum)K.St.1/3 (Ciocârlia)

Kom. Gen.d.dtsch. Lw.i. Rum (general in chief of German Air Force in Romania) Bucharest

Jagdabschnittsführer Rum. (chief of sector fighters of Romania) Bucharest

Fighters
I./JG.53 (Târgşorul-Nou)
III./JG.77 (Mizil)
(Rum)I./JG.2 (Roşiori)
(Rum)43. J.St.(Roşiori)
(Rum)63.J.St.(Roşiori)
(Rum)64.J.St.(Roşiori)
(Rum)VII JGr.(Popești-Leordeni)
(Rum)59./VII JGr.(Popești-Leordeni)
(Rum)61./VII JGr.(Popești-Leordeni)
(Rum)62./VII JGr.(Popești-Leordeni)
(Rum)VII.JGr. (Boteni)
(Rum)53./VII.J.St (Boteni)
(Rum)57./VII.J.St.(Boteni)
(Rum)51.J.St. (Ţepeş Vodă)
(Rum)52.J.St. (Mamaia)
(Rum)58.J.St. (Pipera)

Night fighters
10./NJG.6 (Otopeni-Bucharest)
12./NJG.6 (Otopeni-Bucharest)
11./(Detach)NJG.100 (Otopeni-Bucharest)
4./(N)JG.301 (Mizil)
6./(N)JG.301 (Târgşorul-Nou)
(Rum)1./NJ.St. (Otopeni-Bucharest)

Commanding officers

Generaloberst Alexander Löhr, 18 March 1939 – 20 July 1942
Generalfeldmarschall Wolfram Freiherr von Richthofen, 20 July 1942 – 4 September 1943
Generaloberst Otto Deßloch, 4 September 1943 – 17 August 1944
Generalleutnant Alexander Holle, 25 August 1944 – 27 September 1944
Generaloberst Otto Deßloch, 28 September 1944 – 21 April 1945

Chief of staff

Oberst Günther Korten, 18 March 1939 – 19 December 1939
Oberst Herbert Olbrich, 19 December 1939 – 21 July 1940
Obstlt Andreas Nielsen, 21 July 1940 – 3 November 1940
Oberst Richard Schimpf, 4 November 1940 – 15 January 1941
Generalleutnant Günther Korten, 15 January 1941 – 12 August 1942
Oberst Hans-Detlef Herhudt von Rohden, 24 August 1942 – 23 February 1943
Oberst Karl-Heinrich Schulz, 1 March 1943 – 25 March 1943
General Otto Deßloch, 26 March 1943 – 3 September 1943
Generalmajor Karl-Heinrich Schulz, 3 September 1943 – 21 April 1945

References
Notes

References
 Luftflotte 4 @ Lexikon der Wehrmacht
 Luftflotte 4 @ The Luftwaffe, 1933-45

German Air Fleets in World War II
Military units and formations established in 1939
Military units and formations disestablished in 1945